The men's 200m freestyle S3 event at the 2008 Summer Paralympics took place at the Beijing National Aquatics Center on 9 September. There were no heats in this event.

Final

Competed at 18:32.

 
WR = World Record.

References
 
 

Swimming at the 2008 Summer Paralympics